Homozeugos conciliatum is a species of grass in the family Poaceae native to Angola.

Homozeugos conciliatumis a perennial herb forming clumps, spreading by means of underground rhizomes.

References

External links
 Grassbase - The World Online Grass Flora

Andropogoneae
Flora of Angola